The following list of C++ template libraries details the various libraries of templates available for the C++ programming language.

The choice of a typical library depends on a diverse range of requirements such as: desired features (e.g.: large dimensional linear algebra, parallel computation, partial differential equations), commercial/opensource nature, readability of API, portability or platform/compiler dependence (e.g.: Linux, Windows, Visual C++, GCC), performance in speed, ease-of-use, continued support from developers, standard compliance, specialized optimization in code for specific application scenarios or even the size of the code-base to be installed.

General 
 Active Template Library (Windows)
 Adaptive Communication Environment
 Adobe Source Libraries
 AGG (anti-aliased rendering library)
 Boost
 CGAL – Computational Geometry Algorithms Library
 Concurrent Collections for C++ (CnC)
 Dlib
 Embedded Template Library
 IT++
 KFRlib Audio and DSP library with extensive use of template expressions.
 Loki
 mlpack – machine learning
 ODB ORM and Database-Aware Container Template Library
 Oracle Template Library
 PETSc – Portable, Extensible Toolkit for Scientific Computation
 POCO C++ Libraries
 Template Numerical Toolkit
 Threading Building Blocks (TBB)
 Windows Template Library
 Windows Runtime Library

Standard Template Library and derivates 
 Standard Template Library
 GNU C++ Standard Library (libstdc++)
 libc++, part of clang++
 STAPL
 EASTL

Linear Algebra 
 Armadillo C++ Library
 Blitz++
 Eigen Library
 Matrix Template Library
 Trilinos

See also

External links 
 Linear Algebra Libraries (A well-done survey by Claire Mouton, from INRIA, France in 2009)
List of open source C++ library

C++ libraries